Atlıca is a village in the Mazıdağı District of Mardin Province in Turkey. The village had a population of 465 in 2021.

References 

Villages in Mazıdağı District
Kurdish settlements in Mardin Province